CEZ stands for:

 one of Falconbridge Ltd.'s refineries
 a Czech news channel
 IATA airport code for Cortez Municipal Airport
 CEZ Group, a Czech energy company
 The Chernobyl Exclusion Zone